Piper laevigatum is a species of plant in the family Piperaceae. It is found in Colombia, Panama, and Peru.

References

laevigatum
Least concern plants
Taxonomy articles created by Polbot